Haploparmena is a genus of longhorn beetles of the subfamily Lamiinae, containing the following species:

 Haploparmena angolana Aurivillius, 1913
 Haploparmena marmorata Breuning, 1940

References

Morimopsini